Jalan Gunung Brinchang, Federal Route 432, is a federal road in Cameron Highlands, Pahang, Malaysia. It is the highest paved road in Malaysia. It is also a main route to the Sungai Palas Tea BOH Estate.

Route background
Jalan Gunung Brinchang is a 6.7-km single-lane paved road from the bottom to the top of Gunung Brinchang. Its terminal junction at the Federal Route 59 is located about 4.2 km from Brinchang, Cameron Highlands. The gradient varies between 5% to 10% until the end of the maintenance limit border at Gunung Irau camping site, where the gradient becomes steeper (up to 20%). As a result, the speed limit for this road is 20 km/h only. As a result, the short 6.7-km journey from the bottom to the top may take about half an hour.

At most sections, the Federal Route 432 was built under the JKR R1 road standard, with a speed limit of 20 km/h.

List of junctions

References

Cameron Highlands
Malaysian Federal Roads